The sequoia slender salamander (Batrachoseps kawia) is a species of salamander in the family Plethodontidae.
It is endemic to California, in Tulare County in the western United States.

Distribution

The sequoia slender salamander's natural habitat is in riparian woodlands and temperate coniferous forests in the western Sierra.

See also
Giant sequoia – Sequoiadendron giganteum

References

External links
IUCN: all species searchpage

Batrachoseps
Salamander
Salamander
Fauna of the Sierra Nevada (United States)
Taxonomy articles created by Polbot
Amphibians described in 1998